Love, Lies and Records is a British drama series, first broadcast on BBC One from 16 November to 21 December 2017. It follows registrar Kate Dickenson (Ashley Jensen) as she tries to juggle her personal life with the daily dramas of births, marriages, deaths and relationships and the impact they have on her. The series was written, created and directed by Kay Mellor.

Cast

Main
 Ashley Jensen as Kate Dickenson
 Adrian Bower as Rob Armstrong
 Kenny Doughty as Rick Severs
 Mark Stanley as James/Jamie  McKenzie
 Rebecca Front as Judy Fellows
 Rochenda Sandall as Anna Dickenson

Recurring
 Lily Mae Pickering as Lucy
 Mandip Gill as Talia
 Rhys Cadman as Tom
 Leila Mimmack as Marcia
 Gaja Filač as Kristina
 Katarina Čas as Dominika

Episodes

Series 1 (2017)

Home Media
A series DVD was released via Acorn Media in December 2017.

References

External links

2017 British television series debuts
2017 British television series endings
2010s British drama television series
2010s British television miniseries
Adultery in television
English-language television shows
BBC television dramas
2010s British LGBT-related drama television series
Television shows set in West Yorkshire